Karim Abdelrahim (born 27 October 1992) is an Egyptian handball player for Zamalek and the Egyptian national team.

He participated at the 2017 World Men's Handball Championship.

References

1992 births
Living people
Egyptian male handball players
Handball players at the 2010 Summer Youth Olympics
Youth Olympic gold medalists for Egypt
Competitors at the 2013 Mediterranean Games
Mediterranean Games gold medalists for Egypt
Mediterranean Games medalists in handball
21st-century Egyptian people